KWMY is a commercial radio station in Joliet, Montana, broadcasting to the Billings, Montana area on 105.9 FM. Licensed to Joliet, Montana, United States, the station serves the Billings area.  The station is currently owned by Connoisseur Media.

KWMY airs a classic hits format branded as “My 105.9”.
From 2006-2009 KWMY FM was KPBR FM branded as "Rockin' Country 105.9 The Bar".

On May 7, 2019, Connoisseur Media announced that it would sell its Billings cluster to Desert Mountain Broadcasting, an entity formed by Connoisseur Billings general manager Cam Maxwell. The sale closed on July 31, 2019.

References

External links
My 105.9 official website

WMY
Radio stations established in 2006
2006 establishments in Montana